Failaga Afamasaga (born 5 March 1989) is a Samoan rugby union player. His usual position is as a Centre, and he currently plays for Colorno in Top12 .

From 2016 to 2018 he played for Zebre.

After playing for Samoa Under 19 squad in 2007, from 2015 to 2016 he was named in the Samoa and Samoa A squads.

References

External links
ESPN Profile
It's Rugby England Profile

1989 births
Living people
Samoan rugby union players
Samoa international rugby union players
Rugby union centres